Won Shin-yun (born October, 1969) is a South Korean film director. Won has the unique background of having been a stuntman before making his directorial horror film debut The Wig (2005). He filmed a series of thrillers, including A Bloody Aria (2006), Seven Days (2007) and The Suspect (2013). The Suspect was a  box office hit with over 4.1 million admissions.

Filmography 
Piano Man (1996) - stunt/martial art department
No. 3 (1997) - stunt/martial art department
Deep Blue (1997) - stunt/martial art department
Whispering Corridors (1998) - stunt/martial art department
Calla (1999) - stunt/martial art department
A Cradle Song (short film, 2002) - director, screenwriter
Bread and Milk (short film, 2003) - director, screenwriter 
The Wig (2005) - director, script editor 
A Bloody Aria (2006) - director, screenwriter
Seven Days (2007) - director, script editor
Robot Taekwon V - Live (2008, aborted due to financing) - director
The Suspect (2013) - director, script editor
Memoir of a Murderer (2017) - director, screenwriter 
The Battle: Roar to Victory (2019) - director
The Fifth Column (TBA) - director

References

External links 
 
 
 

1969 births
Living people
South Korean film directors
South Korean screenwriters